The 2014 United Nations Security Council election was held on 16 October 2014 during the 69th session of the United Nations General Assembly, held at United Nations Headquarters in New York City. The elections were for five non-permanent seats on the UN Security Council for two-year mandates commencing on 1 January 2015.
In accordance with the Security Council's rotation rules, whereby the ten non-permanent UNSC seats rotate among the various regional blocs into which UN member states traditionally divide themselves for voting and representation purposes, the five available seats were allocated as follows:

One for Africa
One for the Asia-Pacific Group
One for Latin America and the Caribbean
Two for the Western European and Others Group

The five members will serve on the Security Council for the 2015–16 period. The countries elected were Angola, Malaysia, New Zealand, Spain, and Venezuela.

Candidates

Western European and Others Group

Latin American and Caribbean Group

Asia-Pacific Group
 (withdrew prior to election)

African Group

Campaign
Malaysian Permanent Representative to the UN Datuk Hussein Haniff said: "I have been participating in all the open debates. The Malaysian mission is actively engaged in lobbying to get elected. We are the only candidate from Asia, so far, for a UNSC non-permanent seat, and need to get a two-thirds majority in the General Assembly for a non-permanent membership". Additionally, he asserted that while Malaysia was the sole candidate as of the end of 2013 for the seat, he hopes that "this will remain so until the electoral process is finalised". Foreign Minister Dato' Seri Anifah Aman also said that "We must not take it for granted. We have to work very hard and we have to engage and meet leaders from various countries to secure the seat, but I am quite confident that Malaysia has a very good name globally".

Opinions about Venezuela's candidacy
Due to the ongoing protests against the government within Venezuela, and the International Criminal Court's reopening of the preliminary investigation of the head of state and others on suspicions of Crimes Against Humanity, there have been objections from domestic dissidents, such as Diego Arria, former ambassador of Venezuela to the United Nations during Venezuela's last term on the Security Council and Governor of the Federal District of Caracas in the mid-1970s during the presidency of Carlos Andrés Pérez, to having Venezuela as an elected member of the Security Council. Opposition has also come from figures such as Hillel Neuer, head of human rights organization UN Watch, according to whom "[e]lecting Venezuela to the UN Security Council is like making a pyromaniac into the fire chief".

Result

African and Asia-Pacific Groups

Latin American and Caribbean Group

Western European and Other Group

See also

List of members of the United Nations Security Council
Fiji and the United Nations
New Zealand and the United Nations
European Union and the United Nations

References

2014
2014 elections
Non-partisan elections
2014 in international relations
October 2014 events